John Callum Stewart (born 8 February 1997), known professionally as JC Stewart or Callum Stewart, is a Northern Irish singer-songwriter. In 2020, he went viral after Jennifer Aniston reposted his parody of the theme song from Friends. He released his EP When the Lights Hits the Room later that year.

Early life 
Stewart grew up on a farm in Magherafelt, County Londonderry, Northern Ireland. He has two younger sisters and is the fourth generation of JC Stewarts, with his family running a grocery business of the same name.

Despite not coming from a particularly musical family, Stewart sang in school and was encouraged by his mum to attend a local theatre where he learnt to make music and fell in love with songwriting aged 14. He notes that his dad's record collection inspired him to listen to The Who and The Band.

Once he had finished school Stewart took a gap year and then moved to Brighton to study International Relations at Sussex University but dropped out of university and moved to London to pursue music instead.

Career 
In 2014, Stewart independently released his debut single "Gold".

He signed to Warner Records in 2018 and released two singles, "Medicine" and "Like I Did". Stewart co-wrote the track "Hollywood" which featured on Lewis Capaldi's 2019 debut album Divinely Uninspired to a Hellish Extent. Stewart released four further tracks of his own that year:"Have You Had Enough Wine?", "Bones", "Pick Up Your Phone" and "The Wrong Ones". Stewart held a four-night residency at the Islington in September 2019, which sold out within a few hours. He also  toured with the likes of Lewis Capaldi, Lauv and Anne-Marie.

In 2020, Stewart released two singles "Lying That You Love Me" and "I Need You to Hate Me". He uploaded a parody of the Friends theme song, "I'll Be There for You", to TikTok which caught the attention of Jennifer Aniston and subsequently led to his first appearances on U.S. television. His collaboration on a track with 220 Kid, "Too Many Nights", which peaked at number 72 on the UK Singles Chart. Stewart also released his debut EP When the Light Hits the Room in November 2020. He co-wrote the EP in two weeks with Tom Odell, whom he has cited as one of his biggest musical heroes.

In January 2021, Stewart released his single "Break My Heart", which was co-written with Niall Horan and Plested. He was also named MTV's Push Artist of the Month.

Discography

Extended plays

Singles

See also
 List of artists who reached number one on the Czech Republic Rádio Top 100

Notes

References 

Living people
1997 births
Singer-songwriters from Northern Ireland
Musicians from County Londonderry